Moscow on the Hudson is a 1984 American romantic comedy-drama film written and directed by Paul Mazursky which stars Robin Williams as a Soviet circus musician who defects while on a visit to the United States. It co-stars María Conchita Alonso (in her film debut), Elya Baskin as the circus clown, Savely Kramarov as one of two KGB apparatchiks, Alejandro Rey as the musician's immigration attorney, and Cleavant Derricks as his first American host and friend.

The film was released on April 6, 1984.

Plot
Vladimir Ivanoff, a saxophonist with the Moscow circus, lives in a crowded apartment with his extended family. He stands in lines for hours to buy toilet paper and shoes. When Boris, the apparatchik assigned to the circus, criticizes Vladimir for being late to rehearsal and suggests Vladimir may miss the approaching trip to New York City, Vladimir gives Boris a pair of shoes from the queue that made Vladimir late. While Ivanoff is riding in his friend Anatoly's Lada, Anatoly stops to buy fuel for his car from a mobile black market gasoline dealer. While the friends wait for the gasoline seller to fill Anatoly's jerrycans, the two practice their English.

The circus troupe is sent to perform in New York City. Anatoly, who has talked of little else but defecting, can't bring himself to go through with it; and Vladimir, who had opposed the scheme as reckless and foolhardy, suddenly decides to do it. He runs from his Soviet controllers and hides behind a perfume counter at Bloomingdale's under the skirt of the clerk, Lucia Lombardo. When the New York City Police Department and the FBI arrive, Vladimir stands up to his controllers and defects with news cameras rolling. Vladimir is left with nothing but the clothes on his back, the money in his pocket, and a pair of blue jeans he had planned to buy for his girlfriend in Moscow.

Lionel Witherspoon, a security guard who protected Vladimir from his Russian handlers during the defection, takes him home to Harlem to live with Lionel's mother, unemployed father, sister, and grandfather—a living arrangement noticeably similar to Vladimir's family back in Moscow.

With the help of sympathetic immigration attorney Orlando Ramirez, a Cuban emigrant, Vladimir soon adapts to life in the United States. Vladimir attempts to find work despite speaking little English and fearing the threat of his former KGB handlers. He initially works as a busboy, McDonald's cashier, sidewalk merchant, and limousine driver. Although these jobs enable Vladimir to eventually move into his own apartment, he begins to doubt he will ever play saxophone professionally again.

Vladimir starts a relationship with Lucia. At a party celebrating Lucia's becoming an American citizen, Vladimir proposes to her; but she refuses and breaks up with him. Lionel decides to return to Alabama to be close to his minor son. However, more bad news comes in a letter from Vladimir's family that his grandfather has died.

Grieving, Vladimir goes to a Russian nightclub to ease his mind. When he returns home late to his apartment building drunk, he is mugged by two African American youths. He reports the incident to the police with his attorney Orlando present; and the two go to a diner where Vladimir rants about his misfortunes. During a confrontation with a burly man who reveals himself also as a Russian defector, Vladimir comes to appreciate his good fortune of living in the United States. Soon after, Lucia reunites with Vladimir telling him that she is not ready for marriage but would love to live with an immigrant. Lionel moves back from Alabama and takes over Vladimir's job driving a limousine.

Vladimir encounters his former KGB handler, who is now a street vendor selling hotdogs. He admitted he had to flee the USSR himself due to his failure to prevent Vladimir's defection, but has also come to appreciate New York City. Vladimir soon gets a job in a nightclub, where he once again plays saxophone.

Cast

 Robin Williams as Vladimir Ivanov
 María Conchita Alonso as Lucia Lombardo
 Cleavant Derricks as Lionel Witherspoon
 Alejandro Rey as Orlando Ramirez
 Savely Kramarov as Boris
 Oleg Rudnik as Yuri
 Elya Baskin as Anatoly Cherkasov
 Yakov Smirnoff as Lev

Production
According to Director Mazursky, the idea for the film came from Mazursky's own grandfather's emigration from Ukraine through Russia nearly 80 years before. In developing the script, the director contacted the Russian immigrant community and made his first trip to Russia. "Most Russians," noted the director at the time, "are just trying to survive. Yet, all Russians who leave their country leave behind something they treasure and love. It's a terrible conflict for them, so the act of bravery is overwhelming."

After considering many locations for the Moscow portion of the film, Mazursky settled on Munich, based on the flexibility Bavaria Studios offered him with full control over an authentic "Eastern European street."

Williams learned Russian for the film in a crash course and also learned to play the saxophone.

Lawsuit
The poster, depicting a bird's eye view of New York with Moscow and Russia beyond, prompted a lawsuit by artist Saul Steinberg. Steinberg alleged that the movie poster infringed the copyright in View of the World from 9th Avenue, his famous cover illustration for a 1976 issue of The New Yorker. The district court agreed and awarded summary judgment to Steinberg in Steinberg v. Columbia Pictures Industries, Inc., 663 F. Supp. 706 (S.D.N.Y. 1987).

Reception
The film was moderately successful at the box office, bringing in $25 million in ticket sales.

 On Metacritic, it has a score of 67%, based on 11 reviews.

Vincent Canby of The New York Times said that the film "isn't ill conceived; rather, it seems unfinished, not yet thought through," with Canby finding the scene of Vladimir's defection inside of Bloomingdale's to be the film's funniest, a "tumultuous sequence, in which prissy floorwalkers, members of the Soviet secret police, the store's public-relations personnel, New York City policemen and Federal Bureau of Investigation agents all are working at cross purposes." Pauline Kael of The New Yorker wrote that it was "a wonderful comedy about a tragedy", and that "imaginative and mellow, this movie displays Mazursky's distinctive funky lyricism at its best", though "the film's comic rhythm (though not its mood) falters in the last third."

References

External links
 
 
 

1984 films
1980s romantic comedy-drama films
American romantic comedy-drama films
Cold War films
Circus films
Defection in fiction
Jazz films
Films about immigration to the United States
Films directed by Paul Mazursky
Films set in New York City
Films set in Moscow
Films shot in Munich
Films shot in New York City
Columbia Pictures films
1984 comedy films
1984 drama films
1980s English-language films
1980s American films